Kirby Miller (born c. 1932) was a Canadian football player who played for the BC Lions. He played college football at the University of Texas.

References

1930s births
Living people
Canadian football guards
BC Lions players